Harish Chandra Burnwal or Harish Chandra Barnwal is an Indian writer, journalist, lyricist and Bhajan singer. He received a Bharatendu Harishchandra Award for his work Television ki Bhasha in 2011. Harish has also been credited for the record of producing the world’s first vBook, which was launched by IGNCA working under Cultural Ministry, Government of India. The book garnered rave reviews and was launched by BJP’s national president Shri J. P. Nadda on 17 September 2020, the birthday of P.M. Shri Narendra Modi.

Personal life
Burnwal was born in Neamatpur near Asansol in West Bengal. He has a Bachelor of Political Science from Delhi University(Topper) and a Masters in Television Journalism from Jamia Millia Islamia. He has a Master of Journalism degree in Journalism from Guru Jamveshwar University and PG Diploma in Human Rights.

Published works
Burnwal has published many books, but Television ki Bhasha is his most famous book.

Books Collection
Television ki Bhasha
Sach kahata hun
Modi Mantra
Modi Sutra
Modi Neeti

Poetry Collection
 Laharon ki Goonj

vBook
 Lord Of Records - World's first vBook

Bhajan
 To Kya Mera Koi Kanhaiya Nahi - Krishna Bhajan

Awards
Burnwal archive many awards from his own hard work.

Bharatendu Harishchandra Awards
 Lord Baden Powell National Award
 Akhil Bharatiya Amritlal Nagar Award
 Kadambini Award
 Kathadesh Award
 Narad Award

References

External links
 
 
 

Living people
Indian journalists
People from Asansol
People from West Bengal
Delhi University alumni
1976 births